Acanthurus nigroris is a species of tang from the Indo-Pacific. It occasionally makes its way into the aquarium trade. It grows to a size of 25 cm in length.

References

Acanthurus
Fish of Hawaii
Fish described in 1835